George H. Denton (born 14 December 1939 in Medford, Massachusetts, USA)  is a Professor of Geological Sciences and Quaternary Studies at the University of Maine.

Biography 
Denton earned his Ph.D. at the Yale University in 1965, and was the first scientist from the University of Maine elected to the National Academy of Sciences. His primary interest is the geological history of large ice sheets and smaller mountain glaciers, and in particular the role of these ice sheets in Quaternary and late-Tertiary ice ages. He also focuses on the abrupt ocean-atmosphere reorganizations in glacial cycles. One current project (2015) deals with the Quaternary and late Tertiary history of the Antarctic Ice Sheet. Studies of late Quaternary glacial deposits elucidate the role of the Antarctic Ice Sheet during the last few ice ages. Studies of late Tertiary deposits bear on fundamental climatic changes that preceded Quaternary ice ages. Recent projects involved reconstruction of Northern Hemisphere ice sheets during the last ice age. Another project deals with the alpine glacier history of the Chilean Andes. He led a party of scientists doing field studies in Chile in 1991–99, and in New Zealand in 2000–08 together with his close colleague throughout his career, the late Norwegian Quaternary geologist Professor Bjørn G. Andersen of the University of Oslo.

Denton has been widely acclaimed for his research in glacial geology and the Denton Glacier and the Denton Hills in Antarctica were named in his honor. In 1990, he received the prestigious Vega Medal (Gold) from the Swedish Society for Anthropology and Geography and in 1996 he was elected to the Royal Swedish Academy of Sciences. Denton's research has inspired several generations of students, many of whom have picked up researching in Earth Science.

Honors 
1990: Recipient of the Vega Medal (Gold) from the Swedish Society for Anthropology and Geography
1996: Elected to the Royal Swedish Academy of Sciences
2002: Elected to the National Academy of Sciences

References

External links 
SelectedWorks of George H. Denton
 Glacier History of the New Zealand Southern Alps by George H. Denton at Climate Change Institute at the University of Maine

American glaciologists
1939 births
Living people
Quaternary geologists
Yale University alumni
Members of the Royal Swedish Academy of Sciences
Members of the United States National Academy of Sciences
University of Maine faculty
People from Orono, Maine
20th-century American geologists
21st-century American geologists
21st-century American scientists